Khaidavyn Gantulga (born 9 March 1965) is a Mongolian boxer. He competed in the men's welterweight event at the 1988 Summer Olympics.

References

External links
 

1965 births
Living people
Mongolian male boxers
Olympic boxers of Mongolia
Boxers at the 1988 Summer Olympics
Place of birth missing (living people)
Welterweight boxers
20th-century Mongolian people